The Pursuit of Accidents is the third studio album released by the jazz/funk British musical group Level 42, in 1982. It was issued on CD in 1985. It was re-issued on CD in 2000 as part of a two disc set with the album "Standing In The Light", and again in 2007 as a stand-alone disc. The album reached #17 on the UK album charts.

The album features three singles. The first single "Are You Hearing (What I Hear)?" peaked at #49; the second, "Weave Your Spell", peaked at #43. The third single was "The Chinese Way", and became the band's first top thirty hit when it reached #24 in 1983. It was issued in six countries beyond the United Kingdom, including Ireland, Germany, Spain and United States of America.

Track listing
 "Weave Your Spell"  (Lindup, King, P. Gould) – 5:30
 "The Pursuit Of Accidents"  (Badarou, King, Lindup, P. Gould) – 7:44
 "Last Chance"  (P.Gould, King, Lindup) – 4:30
 "Are You Hearing (What I Hear)?"  (King, P. Gould, R. Gould) – 4:58
 "You Can't Blame Louis"  (King, P. Gould, Badarou) – 5:05
 "Eyes Waterfalling"  (King, P. Gould, Lindup, R. Gould) – 5:58
 "Shapeshifter"  (King) – 5:09
 "The Chinese Way"  (King, P. Gould, Badarou) – 5:53
 "The Chinese Way" (extended John Luongo remix) 7:23 – included on the 1985 CD issue
 "You Can't Blame Louis" (extended remix) 6:14 – included on the 1985 CD issue

Personnel 

Level 42
 Mark King – vocals, additional keyboards, bass guitar, percussion
 Mike Lindup – vocals, acoustic piano, electric piano, Prophet-5, Minimoog, percussion
 Boon Gould – guitars
 Phil Gould – drums, percussion, Roland TR-808, backing vocals
with:
 Wally Badarou – Prophet-5, Solina String Ensemble
 Pete Wingfield – clavinet on "Are You Hearing (What I Hear)?"
 Pete Jacobson – Roland Jupiter-4 on "Last Chance"

Production 
 Mike Vernon – producer 
 Jerry Boys – engineer, mixing 
 Nick Launay – rhythm track recording (2)
 Dick Plant – recording (4)
 David Bascombe – additional engineer 
 Gordon Milne – additional engineer
 Alwyn Clayden – sleeve design 
 Bruce Gill – sleeve design
 Jay Myrdal – photography

1982 albums
Level 42 albums
Albums produced by Mike Vernon (record producer)
Polydor Records albums
Albums recorded at Morgan Sound Studios